The Australian national soccer team may refer to:

 The Socceroos - Australian men's national soccer team
 The Matildas - Australian women's national soccer team
 The Olyroos - Australian men's under 23 soccer team
 The Young Socceroos - Australian men's under 20 soccer team
 The Young Matildas - Australian women's under 20 soccer team
 The Joeys - Australian men's under 17 soccer team
 The Junior Matildas - Australian women's under 17 soccer team
 The Pararoos - Australian men's Paralympic soccer team
 The Beach Socceroos - Australian men's beach soccer team

See also
 Soccer in Australia